Ocoonita is an unincorporated community in Lee County, Virginia, United States.

History
A post office was established at Ocoonita in 1893, and remained in operation until it was discontinued in 1960. Legend has it Ocoonita was the name of a Native American princess.

References

Unincorporated communities in Lee County, Virginia
Unincorporated communities in Virginia